The 2020 North Dakota Senate election were held on November 3, 2020, to elect members from all even-numbered seats of the North Dakota Senate. Primary elections were held on June 9, 2020.

Retirements

Republicans 
 District 22: Gary Lee retired.
 District 34: Dwight Cook retired.

Incumbents defeated

In the general election

Democrats 
 District 12: John Grabinger lost re-election to Cole Conley.
 District 24: Larry Robinson lost re-election to Michael Wobbema.
 District 26: Jim Dotzenrod lost re-election to Jason Heitkamp.

Predictions

Close races 
Districts where the margin of victory was under 10%:

Election results

District 2

District 4

District 6

District 8

District 10

District 12

District 14

District 16

District 18

District 20

District 22

District 24

District 26

District 28

District 30

District 32

District 34

District 36

District 38

District 40

District 42

District 44

District 46

See also
 2020 North Dakota elections
 2020 United States state legislative elections

References

North Dakota Senate
Senate
North Dakota Senate elections